Güce is a town and a district of Giresun Province in the Black Sea region of Turkey.

It is a hilly district, and its lower areas are used for cultivating hazelnuts plus some tea and corn.

Güce itself is a small town of 2,860 people providing basic amenities to the surrounding district. Güce is 55 km from the city of Giresun and 14 km inland from the Black Sea along a narrow winding road.

References

External links

  the Güce page on the Giresun province official website

Populated places in Giresun Province
Districts of Giresun Province
Towns in Turkey